Kalatak Sar (also Romanized as Kalātak Sar) is a village in Gafr and Parmon Rural District, Gafr and Parmon District, Bashagard County, Hormozgan Province, Iran. At the 2006 census, its population was 167, in 46 families.

References 

Populated places in Bashagard County